Jacques Gaillard (born 16 August 1950) is a French ski jumper. He competed at the 1972 Winter Olympics and the 1976 Winter Olympics.

References

1950 births
Living people
French male ski jumpers
French male Nordic combined skiers
Olympic ski jumpers of France
Olympic Nordic combined skiers of France
Ski jumpers at the 1972 Winter Olympics
Nordic combined skiers at the 1972 Winter Olympics
Nordic combined skiers at the 1976 Winter Olympics
Place of birth missing (living people)